Hundred Days is the seventh studio album by Singaporean singer JJ Lin, released on 18 December 2009 by Ocean Butterflies.

The track, "Back to Back", is listed at number 17 on the 2010 Hit FM Top 100 Singles of the Year chart.

Track listing
 "X"
 "第幾個100天" (Hundred Days)
 "加油!" (Go!) feat. MC HotDog
 "序：曙光" (Prelude: Twilight)
 "無法克制" (Obsession)
 "背對背擁抱" (Back to Back)
 "跟屁蟲" (Copycat)
 "一個又一個" (One by One)
 "愛不會絕跡" (Love Chronicles)
 "轉動" (The One)
 "媽媽的娜魯娃" (Naruwan)
 "Still Moving Under Gunfire"
 "表達愛" (Show Your Love) feat. Liao Jun

References

External links
  JJ Lin discography@Avex Taiwan

2009 albums
JJ Lin albums
Avex Taiwan albums
Mandarin-language albums
Ocean Butterflies International albums